Brickhouse is a surname. Notable people with the surname include:

Anna Brickhouse, American historian, author, and professor
Jack Brickhouse (1916–1998), American sportscaster
Richard Brickhouse (born 1939), American racing driver
Nancy Brickhouse (born 1960), American academic
Thomas C. Brickhouse (born 1947), American philosopher

See also
 Brickhouse Brown (1960-2018), an American professional wrestler
 Brick House (disambiguation)